Symphytognathidae is a family of spiders with 90 described species in eight genera. They occur in the tropics of Central and South America and the Australian region (with Oceania). Exceptions include Anapistula benoiti, Anapistula caecula, and Symphytognatha imbulunga, found in Africa, Anapistula ishikawai, found in Japan, and Anapistula jerai, found in Southeast Asia.

Morphology
Symphytognathidae are four-eyed spiders and are generally small in size. The opisthosoma is covered in long hairs.

Genera

, the World Spider Catalog accepts the following genera:

Anapistula Gertsch, 1941 — Asia, South America, Portugal, Oceania, Africa, North America, Jamaica
Anapogonia Simon, 1905 — Indonesia
Crassignatha Wunderlich, 1995 — Indonesia, Malaysia
Curimagua Forster & Platnick, 1977 — Panama, Venezuela
Globignatha Balogh & Loksa, 1968 — Brazil, Belize
Iardinis Simon, 1899 — Nepal, India
Patu Marples, 1951 — Asia, Colombia, Oceania, Seychelles
Symphytognatha Hickman, 1931 — Oceania, South America, Caribbean, Mexico, Belize, South Africa

References

 

 
Araneomorphae families